Herminium humidicola is a species of terrestrial orchid endemic to southern China.

References

Orchids of China
humidicola